Italo Pereira is a Brazilian paralympic swimmer. He participated at the 2016 Summer Paralympics in the swimming competition, being awarded the bronze medal in the men's 100 metre backstroke S7 event. Pereira also participated at the 2012 Summer Paralympics in the swimming competition.

References

External links 
Paralympic Games profile

Living people
Place of birth missing (living people)
Year of birth missing (living people)
Brazilian male backstroke swimmers
Swimmers at the 2008 Summer Paralympics
Swimmers at the 2012 Summer Paralympics
Swimmers at the 2016 Summer Paralympics
Medalists at the 2016 Summer Paralympics
Paralympic medalists in swimming
Paralympic swimmers of Brazil
Paralympic bronze medalists for Brazil
S7-classified Paralympic swimmers
21st-century Brazilian people